Poland women's national floorball team is the national team of Poland. , the team was ranked fifth by the International Floorball Federation.

References 

Women's national under-19 floorball teams
Floorball